Oleg Igorevich Marichev (born 7 September 1945 in Velikiye Luki, Russia) is a Russian mathematician. In 1949 he moved to Minsk with his parents. He graduated from the University of Belarus, where he continued to study for the Ph.D. degree. His scientific supervisor was Fedor Gakhov. He is the co-author of a comprehensive five volume series of  Integrals and Series (Gordon and Breach Science Publishers, 1986–1992) together with Yury Brychkov and A. P. Prudnikov. Around 1990 he received the D.Sc. degree (Habilitation) in mathematics from the University of Jena, Germany. In 1992, Marichev started working with Stephen Wolfram on Mathematica. His wife Anna helps him in his job.

Works 

 1981−1986.

 (First published 1986?; fourth printing: 1998; ? printing: 2002.) (798 pages)
 (First published 1986; second printing with corrections: 1988; third printing with corrections: 1992; fourth printing: 1998; ? printing: 2002.) (750 pages.)
 (Second printing: 1998; third corrected printing: 1998; ? printing: 2002.) (800 pages.)
 (Second printing: 1998.) (xviii+618 pages.)
 (xx+595 pages.)

 (reprint 2013 by Let Me Print)
 (630 pages) (reprint 2013 by Let Me Print)
 (663 pages) (reprint 2013 by Let Me Print)
 (710 pages) (reprint 2013 by Let Me Print)

 (2688 pages)
 (1344 pages)
 (1344 pages)

References

External links 
Oleg Marichev. Two Hundred Thousand New Formulas on the Web
Oleg Marichev, member of Wolfram Research's development staff
Stephen Wolfram. Festschrift for Oleg Marichev

 About Oleg Marichev
Oleg Igorevich Marichev (On the Occasion of His 70th Birthday)

1945 births
Living people
People from Velikiye Luki
Russian mathematicians
Soviet mathematicians
Belarusian State University alumni
Wolfram Research people